The Margaret Wrong Prize for African Literature was an annual prize for African literature which existed from 1950 until the early 1960s. Established in memory of the missionary and educational administrator Margaret Wrong, the prize was administered by the International Committee on Christian Literature for Africa. It was awarded for "original literary work by writers of African race resident in a part of Africa to be determined each year by the Trustees".

History
Margaret Wrong died in 1948. A year after Wrong's death, fourteen individuals - including Seth Irunsewe Kale, Rita Hinden, Lord Hailey, Ida Ward and Wrong's partner Margaret Read – wrote to The Times announcing the intention to establish a trust for a literary prize in Wrong's memory. A committee was formed, initially chaired by Gerald Hawkesworth and then by Christopher Cox, Educational Adviser to the Secretary of State for the Colonies. 

The award was originally given to African writers in European languages and Afrikaans, with the recipient receiving both a silver medal and a money prize. In 1954, in reaction to "steady demand for the inclusion of African languages", the award of the silver medal (for writing in an African language) was separated from the money prize (for writing in a European language).

Winners

References

1950 establishments in Africa
African literary awards